Aleksandr Mikhailovich Zakharikov (born 9 February 1961) is a retired Russian professional footballer.

Club career
He made his professional debut in the Soviet Top League in 1980 for FC Zenit Leningrad.

Honours
 Soviet Top League champion: 1984.
 Soviet Top League bronze: 1980.
 Chinese Jia-A League Champion 1995.

References

External links 
 Aleksandr Zakharikov at the  zenit-history.ru

1961 births
Living people
Soviet footballers
Russian footballers
Russian expatriate footballers
Expatriate footballers in China
Soviet Top League players
FC Zenit Saint Petersburg players
FC Dynamo Stavropol players
Shanghai Shenhua F.C. players
Russian expatriate sportspeople in China
Association football defenders
Footballers from Saint Petersburg
FC Dynamo Saint Petersburg players